Automobile roads in Belarus are classified into several categories.

State-owned common access roads
The state-owned roads of common access are managed by the Belavtodor department of the Ministry of Transport and Communications of Belarus.  They are classified into republican roads and local roads. Automobile roads may also be owned by persons, businesses, state enterprises, and military.

Motorway network
Belarus has an extensive system of 4-laned dual carriageways and expressways, currently in expansion. Currently they are:

Local roads
P1: Minsk – Dzyarzhynsk – highway M1 
P2: Stowbtsy – Ivatsevichy – Byaroza – Kobryn
P3: Lahoysk – Zembin – Begoml – Dokshytsy – Hlybokaye – Sharkawshchyna – Braslaw to the border with Latvia
P4: Baranovichi – Lyakhavichy to highway P43 near Russinovich 
P5: Baranovichi – Navahrudak – Iwye
P6: Ivatsevichy – Logishin – Pinsk – Stolin
P7: Kamyenyets – Zhabinka – Fed'kovichi
P8: Pinsk – Luninets
P9: Vysokaye to the border with Poland
P10: Lubcha – Navahrudak – Dzyatlava
P11: Highway M6 near Porechany – Byarozawka – Navahrudak – Karelichy – Mir
P12: Nesvizh – Kletsk
P13: Kletsk – Hantsavichy – Luninets
P14: Polotsk – Dzisna – Myory – Braslaw
P15: Krichev – Orsha – Lepiel; entrance to the city of Horki
P16: Tyuhinichi – Vysokaye to the border with Poland
P17: Brest to the border with Ukraine
P18: Verhnedvinsk – Sharkovshchina – Koziany
P19: Highway M1 – Talachyn – Krupki – highway M1
P20: Vitebsk – Polotsk to the border with Latvia; entrances to the cities of Polotsk, Novopolotsk and Verhnedvinsk
P21: Vitebsk to the border with Russia
P22: Orsha – Dubrovno – highway M1
P23: Minsk – Slutsk – Mikashevichy; entrances to the towns of Slutsk and Soligorsk
P24: Polotsk – Rossony
P25: Vitebsk – Syanno – Tolochin
P26: Talachyn - Kruglae - Nezhkovo
P27: Braslaw – Vidzy – Pastavy – Myadzyel; access to Lithuanian border at Vidzy
P28: Minsk – Maladzyechna – Myadzyel – Narach; entrance to the city of Vileyka and the village of Gatovichi
P29: Ushachi - Vileyka
P30: Gomel – Vietka – Chachersk – Yamnoe
P31: Highway M5 – Babruysk – Mozyr to the border with Ukraine; entrance to the cities of Babruysk, Yelsk and Mozyr
P32: Rechitsa – Loyew
P33: Rechitsa – Hoiniki
P34: Osipovichi – Glusk – Ozarichi
P35: Kalinkovichi – Brahin - Komarin to the border with Ukraine; entrance to the city of Brahin
P36: Mozyr – Lelchitsy – Milosevic to the border with Ukraine
P37: Mikhalki – Naroulia to the border with Ukraine 
P38: Highway M5 at Buda-Koshelevo – Chechersk – Krasnopolle
P39: Rogachev – Zhlobin – highway M5
P40: Borovilany – Ostroshitsy – Lahoysk; entrance to "Aziorny" complex
P41: Slonim – Dziarečyn – Masty – Skidzyel' to the border with Lithuania, entrance to the village of Lunno
P42: Grodno –  to the border with Lithuania
P43: Highway P2 – Ivatsevichy – Babruysk – Krychaw to the border with Russia (onto Moscow)
P44: Grodno – Kosava – Ruzhany – Ivatsevichy
P45: Polotsk – Hlybokaye to the border with Lithuania
P46: Lepiel – Polotsk to the border with Russia
P47: Svislach – Pruzhany – highway P81
P48: Vorona – Ashmyany – Yuratishki – Iwye; entrance to Lithuanian border
P50: Masty – Zelva – Ruzhany
P51: Astryna – Shchuchyn – Vawkavysk
P52: Highway P45 at  – Belarusian Nuclear Power Plant – Astravyets – Ashmyany
P53: Sloboda – Zhodzina – Barysaw – Novosady; entrance to the Mound of Glory
P54: Pershai - Ivyanets - Stowbtsy - Nesvizh
P55: Babruysk - Hlusk - Lyuban – highway P23
P56: Maladzyechna - Volozhin
P57: Kutchino - Lyuban - Viatčyn – highway M10
P58: Minsk – Kalachi – Myadzyel
P59: Lahoysk – Smalyavichy – Maryina Horka
P60: Kupa – Zanarač – Brusy
P61: Uzda – Kapyl – Hulevich (via Starica)
P62: Chashniki – Bobr – Babruysk (via Klichaw)
P63: Barysaw – Vileyka – Ashmyany
P64: Stowbtsy – Mir
P65: Zaslawye – Dzerzinsk – Voziera
P66: Kalachi – Lahoysk
P67: Barysaw – Byerazino – Babruysk
P68: Pukhavichy – Uzda – Negoreloye
P69: Smalyavichy – Smilavičy – Praŭdzinski – Shatsk
P70: Kniažycy – Horki – Lenino
P71: Mogilev – Slawharad
P72: Asipovichy – Svislach
P73: Chavusy – Mstsislaw to the border with Russia
P74: Cherykaw – Krasnapolle – Khotimsk
P75: Highway P43 near Klimavichy – Kastsyukovichy to the border with Russia; entrances to Klimavichy and Kastsyukovichy
P76: Orsha – Shklov – Mogilev
P77: Shklov – Belynichi (via Prigani)
P78: Olekshitsy – Volkovysk – Porazava – Pruzhany
P79: Klichaw - Chechevichi
P80: Slabada – Papiernya
P81: Pruzhany to the border with Poland; entrance to the village of Viskuli
P82: Aktsyabrsky – Parichi – Rechitsa; entrance to Svetlagorska
P83: Brest – Kamyenyets – Belovezhskaya Pushcha National Park
P84: Byaroza – Drahichyn
P85: Slonim – Vysokaye
P86: Highway M8 – Bogushevsk – Syanno – Lepiel – Myadzyel
P87: Vitebsk – Orsha
P88: Zhytkavichy – Davyd-Haradok to the border with Ukraine
P89: Lida – Trokeli – Hieraniony to the border with Lithuania
P90: Parichi – Čyrvony Bierah – highway M5
P91: Highway M5 – Asipovichy – Baranovichi
P92: Maryina Horka – Staryya Darohi
P93: Mogilev – Babruysk
P94: Brest – Tamašoŭka to the border with Ukraine; access to Polish border
P95: Lyntupy – Svir – Smarhon’ – Kreva – Halshany
P96: Mogilev – Rasna – Mstsislaw; entrances to Chavusy and Drybin
P97: Mogilev – Bychaw – Rahachow
P98: Border with Poland – Kamyenyets – Šarašova – Svislach; entrance to the village of Vaŭkastaviec
P99: Baranovichi – Slonim – Vawkavysk – Pahraničny – Grodno; entrance to Polish border
P100: Masty – Vyalikaya Byerastavitsa
P101: Pruzhany – Byaroza
P102: Vysokaye – Kamyenyets – Kobryn
P103: Kletsk – Lyakhavichy
P104: Zhabinka – Kobryn
P105: Gantsevichi – Logishin
P106: Molodechno – Smarhon’; entrance to Smarhon’
P107: Nesvizh – Cimkavičy
P108: Baranovichi – Molchad – Dzyatlava
P109: Liozna – Arechaŭsk – highway M8
P110: Hlybokaye – Pastavy – Lyntupy to the border with Lithuania; entrance to the Lithuanian border
P111: Beshankovichy – Chashniki
P112: Vitebsk – Surazh to the border with Russia
P113: Syanno – Beshankovichy – Ushachy
P114: Haradok – Ula – Kamien'
P115: Vitebsk – Haradok – highway M8
P116: Ushachy – Lepiel
P117: Border with Russia – Kokhanovichi – Verhnedvinsk
P118: Highway P62 near Lyubonichi – Kirawsk
P119: Slawharad – Nikanovich – highway M8
P120: Bykhaw – Byalynichy
P121: Shkloŭ – Kruglae
P122: Mogilev – Cherykaw – Kastsyukovichy
P123: Highway P93 at Sialiec – Mastok – Drybin – Horki
P124: Vietka – Dobrush – Cierachoŭka – border with Russia and Ukraine
P125: Loyew – Brahin
P126: Yelsk – Naroulia
P128: Turov – Lelchitsy – Slovechno – highway P31
P129: Gomel – Gomel Airport
P130: Buda-Koshelevo – Uvarovichi – Kalinin

Toll roads

References